Kristen Marie Olson is an American sociologist and statistician specializing in survey methodology. She is the Leland J. and Dorothy H. Olson Professor of Sociology at the University of Nebraska–Lincoln.

Education and career
Olson graduated in 1999 from Northwestern University, earning a bachelor's degree with honors in mathematical methods in the social sciences. After earning a master's degree in survey methodology in 2003 from the University of Maryland, College Park, she completed a Ph.D. in the same subject in 2007 at the University of Michigan. She joined the faculty at the University of Nebraska–Lincoln in the same year, and was given the Leland J. and Dorothy H. Olson Professorship in 2018. She was president of the Midwest Association for Public Opinion Research for 2013–2014.

Recognition
Olson and her co-authors won the best-paper award of the European Survey Research Association in 2015.
Olson was elected as a Fellow of the American Statistical Association in 2018. She was elected Council of Sections Representative for the ASA Survey Research Methods program in 2021.

References

External links

Home page

Year of birth missing (living people)
Living people
American sociologists
American statisticians
American women sociologists
Women statisticians
Northwestern University alumni
University of Maryland, College Park alumni
University of Michigan alumni
University of Nebraska–Lincoln faculty
Fellows of the American Statistical Association
21st-century American women